Ramya Sathianathan Polytechnic and B.Ed College is a private college in Pudhupatti, India. It offers Diploma Courses and B.Ed.

History 
The school was co-founded by Civil Engineer R. Sathianathan, B.E. He had helped many of his friends and customers to construct buildings for them to start Schools and Colleges. His wife and co-founder Janet Ramya helped ensure that the students were held to high standards of discipline, academic excellence and personal hygiene especially the Girl Students.

In honour of his parents they formed a registered Trust to support the school in 2010.

The pair established two Colleges to educate underprivileged youth. The Technical Institution was named Ramya Sathianathan Polytechnic College in 2011 at Pudupatti Village. The second institution was Ramya Sathianathan College Of Education in 2012 on the same campus.

Courses offered 
UG Courses
 Diploma in Automobile Engineering
 Diploma in Civil Engineering
 Diploma in Electronics and Communication Engineering
 Diploma in Electrical and Electronics Engineering
 Diploma in Mechanical Engineering

Subjects offered in B.Ed
 Tamil
 English
 Mathematics
 Physical Science
 Biological Science
 History
 Geography
 Economics
 Commerce
 Computer Science

Facilities
 Well Equipped Modern Laboratories
 Hostel
 Transport
 Cafeteria
 Library

Other institutions
 Ramya Sathianathan Vidhyashram CBSE School

References

Education in Thanjavur district
Colleges in Tamil Nadu
Colleges of education in India